Dalbergia bathiei is a species of legume in the family Fabaceae. It is found only in Madagascar. It is threatened by habitat loss.

References

Sources

bathiei
Endemic flora of Madagascar
Endangered plants
Taxonomy articles created by Polbot